Rhodopina meshimensis is a species of beetle in the family Cerambycidae. It was described by Hiroshi Makihara in 1980. It is known from Japan.

References

meshimensis
Beetles described in 1980